"Gyöngyhajú lány" ("The girl with pearly hair") is a song by Hungarian rock band Omega. It was written in 1968, composed in 1969, and released on their album 10 000 lépés. "Gyöngyhajú lány" was very popular in many countries, including West Germany, Great Britain, France, Poland, Romania, Czechoslovakia, Yugoslavia and Bulgaria.

The lyrics were written by Anna Adamis, the music was composed by Gábor Presser and the song was sung by János Kóbor.

In 1969, the single "Petróleumlámpa / Gyöngyhajú lány" was released and the song gained popularity.

Omega also recorded other versions of this song in foreign languages: English ("Pearls in Her Hair") and German ("Perlen im Haar").

Other versions
"Gyöngyhajú lány" was covered in Poland (as "Dziewczyna o perłowych włosach"), Czech Republic (as "Paleta" by Markýz John and "Dívka s perlami ve vlasech" by Aleš Brichta), Yugoslavia (as "Devojka biserne kose" by Griva), Bulgaria (as "Батальонът се строява / Batalyonat se stroyava" by Дует "Южен Вятър" / duet "Juzhen Vyatar") and Lithuania (as "Meilės Nėra" by Keistuolių Teatras). It was also covered by Frank Schöbel (as "Schreib es mir in den Sand"). The song was also remixed (e.g. by Kozmix).

Scorpions version

German rock band Scorpions covered the song titled as "White Dove", from the album Live Bites. Released as a single in 1994, it was a top 20 hit in Germany and Switzerland, peaking at numbers 18 and 20, respectively.

Charts

Sampling
In 2013, hip-hop artist Kanye West sampled the song in the outro of "New Slaves", having Frank Ocean sing over it, without personally asking the band for permission, although the sample was cleared for use in the album by their label, Hungaroton Records. However, in May 2016 songwriter Gábor Presser filed a lawsuit seeking $2.5 million in damages for copyright infringement for the use of the sample, which was later settled out of court.

Other uses

In March 2014, the song was used for the reveal trailer of the video game This War of Mine.

In August 2012, the song was used in the official trailer of the film This Ain't California.

In 2016, the melody of the song was used in a German rap-song ″FLOUZ KOMMT FLOUZ GEHT″ by Nimo.

In July 2018, the song was used in the official trailer and in a scene of the film Mid90s.

In 2021, the Australian bank Westpac used the song in their "Life is Everything" campaign.

In 2021, the Second Captains podcast sampled the original version of the song on an audiobed which empathised with the plight of Frank Lampard being expected work with this group of players whilst manager of Chelsea F.C.

In 2022, the French car company Citroën used the song in a TV commercial for their C5 Aircross hybride.

References 

1969 songs
1960s ballads
1970 singles
1973 singles
1994 singles
Rock ballads
Griva songs
Hungarian songs
Scorpions (band) songs
Song recordings produced by Keith Olsen
Songs written by Klaus Meine
Songs written by Rudolf Schenker
PolyGram singles
Mercury Records singles
Bellaphon Records singles